VL Pyry (Finnish language for blizzard) was a Finnish low-winged, two-seated fighter trainer aircraft, built by the State Aircraft Factory (Valtion lentokonetehdas) for use with the Finnish Air Force. The Pyry was in use from 1939 to 1962. The aircraft was a mixed construction of wood, steel, fabric, and duraluminium.

History
The Finnish Air Force ordered a prototype of the aircraft in 1937. It was to be called VL Pyry I and carried the identification number PY-1.

The chief designer was Arvo Ylinen, and the other persons of the design team were Martti Vainio, Torsti Verkkola, and Edward Wegelius. 
 
The first flight was made on 29 March 1939 by the factory test pilot. The FAF ordered 40 aircraft in May and the aircraft were quickly constructed and were ready in the spring of 1941. These were designated VL Pyry II and their identification numbers ran from PY-2 - PY-41.

Operational history
The first unit to be equipped with Pyrys was the Air Force School in Kauhava, in 1941. Around 700 pilots were trained in the aircraft and the type accumulated over 56,000 flying hours over a service life of 20 years. PY-1 and PY-27 made last flights of the Pyry in Härmälä on 7 September 1962.

The plane was tricky to fly, and shown to be unstable and prone to wingtip stalls. In an attempt to fix the wingtip stall issue, four Pyrys (PY-1, -24, -32 and -37) were equipped with trapezoidal wings, as well as serving to test these structures for the VL Myrsky. While these new wings did reduce the risk of stalls, they made the aircraft even more unstable than before. In 1942 all planes were grounded to fix a problem with horizontal stabilizer struts breaking, and the original struts were replaced with V struts, resulting in a more tail-heavy aircraft. To improve stability, the engine mount was lengthened by 16.5cm in 1944, but it was still a difficult plane to fly for inexperienced pilots.

There were 28 accidents of VL Pyry. All together 27 pilots died. The first accident was on 15 June 1941 in Hyvinkää. Pilot Kauno Osmo Meriluoto died. 

The aircraft's final flights were made by PY-1 and PY-27 September 6, 1962.

Surviving aircraft
 The PY-1 prototype can be found at the Kauhava Aircraft Park.
 PY-27 is at the Finnish Aviation Museum in Vantaa.
 PY-35 at the Finnish Air Force Museum in Tikkakoski. 
 The remains of PY-5 are at the Finnish Air Force Museum in Tikkakoski
 The remains of PY-26 are at the Päijänne Tavastia Aviation Museum in Asikkala.

Operators
Finnish Air Force

Specifications (VL Pyry II)

References

External links

1940s Finnish military aircraft
Single-engined tractor aircraft
Low-wing aircraft
Aircraft first flown in 1939